Ducknapped! is a live album by Richard Thompson recorded during the 2003 tour to support the album The Old Kit Bag and released on Thompson's boutique Beeswing label. As with most of Thompson's recent live releases from a tour supporting a new album, the new album is featured heavily, with 9 of The Old Kit Bag 12 songs being featured.

The title is derived from the joke 'ducknapping' of the tour mascot, a stuffed duck, and the subsequent backstage appearance of cod ransom notes.

None of the tracks on this album are included on the Live in Providence DVD which was shot on the same tour. Live in Providence features Rory MacFarlane on bass guitar and double bass. Danny Thompson (no relation) was first call for the 2003 tour and plays on most tracks on this album, but after he was taken ill MacFarlane replaced him.

Track listing
All songs composed by Richard Thompson

"Gethsemane"
"Pearly Jim"
"Outside of the Inside"
"Missie How You Let Me Down"
"A Love You Can't Survive"
"One Door Opens"
"I’ll Tag Along"
"Bank Vault In Heaven"
"She Said It Was Destiny"
"I Misunderstood"
"Valerie"
"Can't Win"
"Jealous Words"
"Word Unspoken, Sight Unseen"

Personnel
 Richard Thompson - guitar and vocals
 Earl Harvin - drums and dumbek
 Danny Thompson - double bass
 Judith Owen - backing vocals on One Door Opens, Jealous Words and Word Unspoken, Sight Unseen.
 Christine Collister - backing vocals on Bank Vault In Heaven and Can't Win
 Rory MacFarlane - bass guitar
 Pete Zorn - backing vocals, acoustic guitar, mandolin, baritone saxophone and bass flute

References

External links
 

2003 live albums
Richard Thompson (musician) live albums
Self-released albums